The Daily Standard was a newspaper published in Brisbane, Queensland, Australia from 1912 to 1936. The newspaper was closely affiliated with the Australian Labor Party (Queensland Branch).

The newspaper was published from its first edition on Tuesday, 10 December 1912 through to its 7322nd edition on Tuesday, 7 July 1936. One of its strongest supporters was Richard Sumner who actively promoted and put up his personal assets as a financial guarantee for it. Sumner was a board member for many years and chairman for several years.

The editors of The Daily Standard included:
 Walter Russell Crampton

Contributors to The Daily Standard included:
 Walter Russell Crampton, sometimes under the pseudonym of Jack Aster
 Henry Tardent, agricultural editor 1913–1929

Digitisation 
The paper has been digitised as part of the Australian Newspapers Digitisation Program of the National Library of Australia.

External links

Notes

Daily Standard
1912 establishments in Australia
Newspapers established in 1912
Daily newspapers published in Australia
Newspapers on Trove
Defunct newspapers published in Queensland